The Swearing Jar is a Canadian romantic musical drama film, directed by Lindsay MacKay and released in 2022. Adapted from Kate Hewlett's musical play of the same name, the film stars Adelaide Clemens as Carey, a music teacher who stages a concert of music about their relationship as a birthday present for her husband Simon (Patrick J. Adams), only to be drawn into a dilemma when she also begins to fall in love with Owen (Douglas Smith), the guitarist she hired to help perform the concert.

The film's cast also includes Kathleen Turner as Simon's mother Bev, as well as David Hewlett, Jade Ma, Nadine Whiteman Roden, Athena Park, Izzi Nagel, Mary Grant, Matilda Legault, Isla Parekh, Randy Singh and Chris Tarpos in supporting roles.

The film was shot in Toronto and Hamilton, Ontario, in 2021.

The film premiered in the Contemporary World Cinema program at the 2022 Toronto International Film Festival on September 11, 2022.

References

External links

2022 films
2022 drama films
Canadian musical drama films
Canadian romantic drama films
Films shot in Hamilton, Ontario
Films shot in Toronto
Films based on Canadian plays
English-language Canadian films
2020s English-language films
2020s Canadian films